Cnemidophorus arenivagus is a species of teiid lizard found in Venezuela.

References

arenivagus
Reptiles described in 1997
Taxa named by Allan L. Markezich
Taxa named by Charles J. Cole
Taxa named by Herbert C. Dessauer
Reptiles of Venezuela